Quatermass is the only studio album by English progressive rock band Quatermass, released in May 1970 by Harvest Records. It was produced by the Swedish producer .

Critical reception
Despite the album not performing well on the charts at the time of the release, it started to attract considerable attention in 1975, when guitarist Ritchie Blackmore covered the second track, "Black Sheep of the Family", for the debut album from Rainbow. As a consequence of the revived interest, Quatermass was re-released and sold further 20,000 copies. Since then, it has gained a cult status  and has received favorable retrospective reviews. Mike DeGagne has given the album a rating of four stars out of five on AllMusic. He has called Quatermass "a must-have for prog rock enthusiasts, especially lovers of the keyboard-dominated style which flourished in the early '70s".

Track listing

Personnel

Quatermass
 J. Peter Robinson – keyboards
 John Gustafson – vocals, bass guitar
 Mick Underwood – drums

Technical personnel
 Anders Henriksson – producer
 Jeff Jarratt – engineer
 Andy Stevens – engineer
 Hipgnosis – cover design, photography
 Steve Newport – design, illustration (1975 re-issue)

References

Quatermass (band) albums
Albums with cover art by Hipgnosis
1970 debut albums
Harvest Records albums